Siege of Bayonne may refer to:

Siege of Bayonne (1130–31), the unsuccessful siege of the town and castle by Alfonso the Battler, King of Aragon and Navarre
Siege of Bayonne (1374), the siege of the town and castle by Henry II of Castile, during the Hundred Years' War
Siege of Bayonne (1451), the siege and capture of the town and castle by the French during the French annexation of Gascony
Siege of Bayonne (1523), the siege of the town and castle during the Italian War of 1521–1526
Siege of Bayonne (1814), the siege of the town and castle by Allied forces under Lieutenant General John Hope, during the Peninsular War